The Peasants' Land Bank was a financial institution of the Russian Empire founded during the reign of Tsar Alexander III, by Nobles'. The Peasants' Land Bank in 1885 was created to help peasants purchase their own farms. The Peasants' Land Bank was somewhat limited in its effectiveness by a lack of funding; it was also not nearly as generous as the Nobles' Land Bank, which had lower interest rates. Bunge also abolished the Poll Tax, which was only paid by peasants, in 1886, which helped to reduce the financial burden the peasants faced.

The Bank began operations in April 1883, with nine branches. In 1888 its activity was extended to include the Kingdom of Poland; by 1891 it had thirty-nine branches.

Each bank was managed by a council consisting of: a manager; an assistant manager; three others appointed by the Ministry of Finance; and lastly a member representing the Ministry of Agriculture.

Under Peter Stolypin the Land Bank was extended to make it easier for the peasants to set up their own farms and by 1907 670.3 million roubles had been repaid out of a total of 2012 million.

References
Sally Waller, Oxford AQA History, Tsarist and Communist Russia (1855-1964)

Defunct banks of Russia
Banks established in 1882
Banks with year of disestablishment missing
1882 establishments in the Russian Empire
Banks of the Russian Empire